Ricardo Alves Coelho da Silva (born 25 March 1993) is a Portuguese professional footballer who plays for Iranian club Tractor S.C. as a midfielder.

Club career

Belenenses
Born in Lourosa (Santa Maria da Feira), Alves played youth football with mainly FC Porto, which he represented from ages 16 to 19 in his second stint. He made his senior debut with C.F. Os Belenenses on 1 August 2012, playing three minutes in a 1–0 home win against S.C. Freamunde in the first round of the Portuguese League Cup.

On 20 January 2013, Alves made his first appearance in the Segunda Liga, coming on as a second-half substitute in a 0–0 home draw with C.D. Santa Clara. In the ensuing summer he was loaned to Portimonense S.C. in the same league, which he later considered to be a "step back" in his career.

Olimpija
In the summer of 2015, after a short spell in Romania with FC Rapid București, Alves signed with NK Olimpija Ljubljana from the Slovenian PrvaLiga. He made his debut in top-flight football on 8 August, starting and scoring in a 2–0 away victory over NK Krško.

Alves and his team won the double in the 2017–18 campaign, with the player contributing a career-best ten league goals to the feat and adding one and two assists in the final of the domestic cup against NK Aluminij (6–1 in Ljubljana).

Later career
On 6 September 2018, Alves joined Russian Premier League club FC Orenburg. On 2 October 2020, his contract was terminated by mutual consent; he remained in the country nonetheless, moving to Football National League side PFC Krylia Sovetov Samara in February 2021.

Alves agreed to an 18-month contract with FC Kairat on 13 July 2021. One year later, he left for the Persian Gulf Pro League with Tractor SC.

International career
Alves was part of the Portuguese squad at the 2013 FIFA U-20 World Cup held in Turkey, playing three matches in an eventual round-of-16 exit.

Career statistics

Honours
Belenenses
Segunda Liga: 2012–13

Olimpija Ljubljana
Slovenian PrvaLiga: 2015–16, 2017–18
Slovenian Football Cup: 2017–18

References

External links

PrvaLiga profile 

1993 births
Living people
Sportspeople from Santa Maria da Feira
Portuguese footballers
Association football midfielders
Liga Portugal 2 players
FC Porto players
Padroense F.C. players
C.F. Os Belenenses players
Portimonense S.C. players
Liga I players
FC Rapid București players
Slovenian PrvaLiga players
NK Olimpija Ljubljana (2005) players
Russian Premier League players
Russian First League players
FC Orenburg players
PFC Krylia Sovetov Samara players
Kazakhstan Premier League players
FC Kairat players
Persian Gulf Pro League players
Tractor S.C. players
Portugal youth international footballers
Portuguese expatriate footballers
Expatriate footballers in Romania
Expatriate footballers in Slovenia
Expatriate footballers in Russia
Expatriate footballers in Kazakhstan
Expatriate footballers in Iran
Portuguese expatriate sportspeople in Romania
Portuguese expatriate sportspeople in Slovenia
Portuguese expatriate sportspeople in Russia
Portuguese expatriate sportspeople in Kazakhstan
Portuguese expatriate sportspeople in Iran